Neomochtherus geniculatus is a species of fly in the robber fly family, Asilidae.

Distribution
This species is present in Europe.

Description
These robber flies have a small facial gibbosity with a few bristles forming the mystax. Sternites are predominantly shiny. Femora are black. The widest point of the distinctly broadened hypopygium is in the middle.

Biology
Adults can be found from May to September. Larvae feed on beetle larvae of the families Cetoniidae, Lucanidae and Melolonthidae, while adults prey on other flies.

Gallery

References

External links
 Geller-Grimm, F. (2011) Information on robber flies

Asilidae
Insects described in 1820